Darbandsar is one of the largest Iranian ski resorts, and is located in Tehran Province. It is located on the Alborz mountain range about 47 kilometres away from the Iranian capital of Tehran.

Darbandsar is the only resort in Iran that is capable of Snowmaking.

See also
List of ski areas and resorts in Iran
List of ski areas and resorts
Sports in Iran

References

Ski areas and resorts in Iran
Shemiranat County